Trade in Maya civilization was a crucial factor in maintaining Maya cities.

Chief staples of Maya economic activities were centered primarily around foods like fish, squash, yams, corn, honey, beans, turkey, vegetables, salt, chocolate drinks; raw materials such as limestone, marble, jade, wood, copper, and gold; and manufactured goods such as paper, books, furniture, jewelry, clothing, carvings, toys, weapons, and luxury goods. The Maya also had an important service sector, through which mathematicians, farming consultants, artisans, architects, astronomers, scribes and artists would sell their services. Some of the richer merchants sold weapons, gold and other valuable items.

Specialized craftsmen also played a large part, creating luxury items and developing devices to overcome specific problems usually by royal decree. They also engaged in long range trade of almost any other necessities such as salt, potato, stone and luxury items because there was a large need for trade in order to bring such basic goods together. The types of trade varied greatly regionally with specific districts of kingdoms typically specializing in a specific trade which contained workers of every skill set needed to produce their designated specialty. Areas were typically given a designated specialty based upon the resources available in their areas which allowed for very rapid production and distribution of a regions products.

Structure
The Maya relied on a strong middle class of skilled and semi-skilled workers and artisans which produced both commodities and specialized goods. Governing this middle class was a smaller class of specially educated merchant governors who would direct regional economies based upon simple supply and demand analysis who would place mass orders as needed by other regions. Above the merchants were highly skilled specialists such as artists, mathematicians, architects, advisers, astronomers. The specialist class would sell their services and create luxury goods based upon their specific skill set. At the top of the structure was a ruler, or rulers, and an array of advisers who would manage trade with other kingdoms, ensure that regions remained stable, inject capital into specific sectors and authorize construction of large public works.
 
For decades, Maya exchange systems and overall economic systems have been viewed as overly simplistic and adhering to ideas of preindustrial political economies put forth by Polanyi. In the mid-20th century, political economy was examined with an emphasis on identifying the evolution of political organization rather than understanding the economic systems that set the foundation for how they function.  Polanyi put forth three modes of exchange for the Maya: reciprocity, redistribution, and market exchange, which limited Maya societies to chiefdom levels of societal complexity. In Polanyi's model of Maya economy there existed highly centralized control of exchange by the elite members of society who maintained their status and a system of civic-ceremonial infrastructure through taxation of tribute goods followed by redistribution down the social ladder to secure loyalty and fealty from others.

Polanyi's legacy and the subsequent substantivist versus formalist debate have reduced interest in the discussion of preindustrial market economies and have created a market/no market dichotomy in political economy literature. However, as more research has been conducted on Maya trade and exchange systems there have been multiple models put forth that recognize higher levels of complexity, various degrees of participation, and fluctuating economic scales related to political organization and collapse. The delineation of trade routes, and acceptance of marketplaces and market exchange economies, has increased due in large part to the archaeological research surrounding Maya obsidian procurement, distribution, production, and exchange.

It is now believed that Classic Maya cities were highly integrated and urbanized, featuring marketplaces and market economies to exchange many goods including obsidian. A market exchange mechanism has been noted at Classic period Calakmul murals that depict a range of specialists near an area that appears to be a market. Linguistic evidence shows that there are words in the Yucatec Maya language for “market” and “where one buys and sells”. The Classic Maya region is highly integrated into the overall trade network but it appears that several routes connected the East and West due to the variety of large, urbanized Maya centers as well as marketplace distribution economies. At Late Classic Coba, marketplaces were determined to have existed in two large plazas that featured multiple causeway entrances, linear/parallel market stall architecture, and geochemical signatures of high Phosphorus levels in arranged patterns which indicate the presence of traded organic goods. In the Puuc region, more central Mexican obsidian entered and while it does appear to be limited to elites only it does appear to be a highly commercialized and valued exchange good linked to Chichen Itzá and market distribution.

Currency
The Maya used several different mediums of exchange and in the trading of food commodities, the barter system was typically used for large orders. Cacao beans were used for everyday exchange in Postclassic times. For more expensive purchases gold, jade and copper were used as a means of exchange. However, these mediums of exchange are not "money" in the modern sense, in different sites and cities, these mediums of exchange were valued differently.

Development
Because of the readily available trade resources and local merchants in most of the Maya territory, small towns did not need to take part in long-distance trading and limited trade to local exchange. Despite the fact that the area was rich in resources, even the most self-sufficient farm families, which were the vast majority of the population, still had to participate in exchanges in order to obtain the necessities (the necessities would generally include some pottery, bronze or copper tools, salt, and imported fish for inland areas). As craftsmen in small cities began to specialize and the cities began to grow, so did the need for increased trade. Cities such as Tikal and El Mirador are two such examples. Tikal, specifically, had a population somewhere in the range of 60,000–120,000 people, which means it would have needed to get food and other goods from up to 100 km away. Because of the size of these, they would have also needed a larger amount of control from the Rulers to oversee it. Eventually the increased trade, and growing cities gave the Rulers more power over their territory and their subjects.

However, not only the central cities in the empire grew. Because of the increased amount of traffic through the smaller cities along trade routes, these once isolated cities grew too, creating a fairly consistent amount of growth throughout the Post-Classic period.

Evidence discovered in the past few decades seems to prove that trade was widespread among the Maya. Artifacts collected under grants from the National Science Foundation, the National Geographic Society, and Howard University, show that hard stones and many other goods were moved great distances (despite the inefficiency of moving goods without so-called 'beasts of burden'). Modern chemical tests have taken these artifacts and confirmed that they originated in locations great distances away. There is also documented trade of goods ranging from honey to quetzal feathers throughout the Maya region.

The goods, which were moved and traded around the empire at long distance, include: salt, cotton mantels, slaves, quetzal feathers, flint, chert, obsidian, jade, colored shells, Honey, cacao, copper tools, and ornaments. Due to the lack of wheeled cars and use of animals, these goods traveled Maya area by the sea.

Because the Maya were so skilled at producing and distributing a wide variety of goods, they built a lifestyle based on trade throughout all of Mesoamerica, which spread to many different groups of people.  It is suggested that because the Maya were so skilled as traders, they may have spared themselves from the wrath of the expanding Aztec empire.  The Aztecs valued the Maya for their ability to produce and trade a variety of different commodities, and because of this, the Aztecs did not feel the need to conquer the Maya.

Commodities

As trade grew in the Postclassic period, so did the demand for commodities. Many of these were produced in large specialized factory-like  workshops around the empire, and then transported elsewhere mostly by sea due to poor roads and heavy cargo. Some of these commodities included, fine ceramics, stone tools, paper, jade, pyrite, quetzal feathers, cocoa beans, obsidian, copper, bronze and salt.

Mostly the main population used the more basic commodities, such as stone tools, salt, cacao beans, fish and manufactured goods such as books and ceramics and wood items. But some of the other commodities like gold, jade, copper, obsidian and other raw materials were goods that upper class and rulers used to show off their power.

Salt
Arguably the most important of these commodities was salt. Salt was not only an important part of the Maya diet, but it also was critical in the preservation of food. By covering meat and other food items in salt the Maya were able to dehydrate it so that it would not rot. Salt, for the most part, was produced near the oceans by drying out large flats of seawater. After the flats were dry, the salt could be collected and moved throughout the empire. The greatest producer of salt in all of Mesoamerica was Yucatán, in which the peoples specialized in salt collection and at one point monopolized the entire salt industry.  Although there were several other salt wells further inland, the Yucatán people were able to monopolize the salt industry because sea salt was the most valuable and highly demanded kind of salt throughout the Mayan empire.

It is estimated that the Early Classic Tikal's population of roughly 45,000 consumed approximately 131.4 tons of salt annually. Not only is it required in diet, but it can also be used as a preservative. Salt was also frequently used for ritual and medicinal purposes. It is also believed that salt was commonly used during childbirth and death. A midwife would offer salt to both parents at birth and a saline solution was sprinkled throughout the house following the death of a family member. Veterans of battle often wore  armor, consisting of short cotton jackets packed with rock salt—the equivalent of the modern "flack jacket" and tight bindings of leather or cloth on forearms and legs. Cotton armor is so much more effective than any other protection.

Three major sources of Salt have been identified for the Petén Lowlands Maya sites, the Pacific Lowlands, the Caribbean coast and the Salinas de los Nueve Cerros in the Chixoy river in the Highlands of Alta Verapaz in Guatemala, where the salt is obtained from a brine springs that flows from a Salt dome, curiously its color is black, this site produced an estimated of 2,000 tons per year.  Other in- land sources such as San Mateo Ixtatán in Huehuetenango and Sacapulas in Quiché also have been documented and are still in use. The Salt was obtained in disposable tin unfired  brine-cooking vessels, such as the ones still used in Sacapulas and San Mateo Ixtatán, Guatemala, that not only evaporated the water, but made blocks of salt, the vessel was thus, a single use. In The Pacific Lowlands, platforms were used to obtain sun-dry salt, near La Blanca such platforms have been documented ca 1000 BC, and are perhaps the oldest in Mesoamerica.

Both methods were used in the production of salt, as has been proved in Nueve Cerros by Andrews and Dillon. The salt was then transported using the river routes, such as the Chixoy, that forms the Usumacinta when it merges with the Pasión river near Altar de Sacrificios.

Cacao/chocolate
Chocolate was used throughout the Maya region to make sauces, and for drinks. It was grown mostly in the lowlands, so it was often transported to the highlands. Chocolate has a long and interesting history in Mesoamerica. From the very beginning of Mesoamerican culture some 3500 years ago, it has been associated with long distance trade and luxury. The  Pacific Coast of Guatemala, thought to be the original source of Olmec culture, was, and remained, an important area of cacao cultivation. The Maya passed on the knowledge of cacao through oral histories, in Jade and Obsidian among other  stonework, pottery and the creation of intricate, multicolored documents (codices) that extolled cacao and documented its use in everyday life and rituals, centuries before the arrival of the Spanish. In the centuries after initial contact between the Spaniards and indigenous peoples of the New World, hundreds of descriptive accounts, monographs and treatises were published that contained information on the agricultural, botanical, economic, geographical, historical, medical and nutritional aspects of cacao/chocolate.

Ceramics and Furniture
Ceramics and furniture were produced in specialized workshops, before being traded for other goods. Often the work produced by a particular artist, or workhouse was heavily sought after by the elite classes of Maya society and therefore artists were usually supported by and primarily catered to the wealthy. Art goods such as jade carvings, paintings, ornate furniture and metal ornaments were also circulated through kingdoms, and local areas amongst the elite classes. This was usually the case because of the strong symbol of power and wealth the fine arts provided. The ceramics produced were mainly plates, vases, and cylindrical drinking vessels. When painted, these pots were usually painted red, with gold and black detailing.

Jade and Obsidian

Rare stones such as jade and pyrite were also very important to the Maya elite. These stones were relatively hard to acquire, so having such treasures helped them to solidify their positions in the society. Many of the stones were collected in the highlands of the empire in Guatemala, so when long-distance trade developed, the Maya were able to move more of these precious stones to the lowland cities.

The Jade route was mainly the Motagua river and a recently discovered land route in the Sierra de las Minas, and then distributed to all the Maya area and beyond, using canoes in the Caribbean routes, as well as the Pasión River route via the land route through Alta Verapaz. A unique and valuable trade item tends to become more valuable as it is traded farther from the source. The incentive is to profit by continuing to trade it until one of three things happens: an owner can't bear to part with it, it reaches a cultural area where it is not valued, or it reaches the bitter end of the trade route.

For the jadeite axes found on the island of Antigua, the second and third may have both applied. Antigua was the far eastern edge of the Taino cultural area and of the Caribbean island chain. This finding is significant geologically and archaeologically as it argues for the primacy of Guatemala as the New World source of jadeite jade and refutes an assertion that all exotic gems and minerals in the Eastern Caribbean were sourced from South America, as no jadeite rock is known from there. (See Jade). The Caribbean route is also the most likely Olmec trade route for Jade.

The fact that Cancuén appears to have prospered for hundreds of years without warfare and that commerce appeared to play a far more important role in everyday life than religion contradicts the widespread view among scholars that religion and warfare were the sources of power for Maya rulers, particularly toward the end of their dominance, after about 600 A.D.

In El Baúl Cotzumalguapa, in the Pacific Lowlands, large workshops have been documented, the production of artifacts was aimed at manufacturing two major products: prismatic blades and projectile points. Both technological types required specialized skills and a centralized productive organization. The major purpose of this production was serving the local and probably the regional demand of cutting tools, throwing weapons with a cutting point, and instruments for scraping, polishing and perforating, all of which could be a part of household maintenance activities. Economic restructuring during the transition from the Classic to the Postclassic periods, as well as the beginning of trade over water, allowed for larger volumes of long-distance trade to occur, and therefore the commodities were able to reach throughout the entire Maya region.

Preclassic Maya-Protoclassic Periods Obsidian
Obsidian exchange in the Preclassic Maya period (2000 BC- 250 AD) largely focused on importing large macrocores and flake nodes from Guatemalan highland sources such as Ixtepeque, San Martin Jilotepeque, and El Chayal. The varying presence and proportions of these different highland obsidian sources at sites across the Maya lowlands suggest multiple trade networks operating independently during the Preclassic. The Tajumulco obsidian source was used as early as the Archaic period (3500-2000 BC) and the Ixtepeque, El Chayal, and San Martin Jilotepque sources were utilized beginning in the Early Preclassic as evidenced by Instrumental Neutron Activation Analysis, or INAA (Asaro et al. 1978:439). El Chayal obsidian from the Guatemalan highlands being found at Preclassic levels in Olmec regions on the Southern Gulf Coast and throughout the Yucatán peninsula point to extensive trade networks connecting the Maya region to other parts of Mesoamerica (Asaro et al. 1978; Hirth et al. 2013). The Northern Belize site of Colha demonstrates the recognition of obsidian as a utilitarian resource during the Preclassic, even when other lithic resources such as chert deposits are locally available (Brown et al. 2004).

Preclassic people in the Copan Valley in Western Honduras utilized obsidian primarily from the Guatemalan highlands but also in small quantities from La Esperanza in Honduras and Ucareo and Pachuca in Central Mexico (Aoyama 2001). This is further evidence of extensive trade networks operating in the Preclassic.  Copan demonstrates that there was variation in obsidian technology and trade in the Preclassic. This region did not feature blade production technology until the Late Preclassic, instead primarily relying on informal nodes and flakes with very limited trade of prismatic blades, which is abnormal when compared to surrounding areas (Aoyama 2001). Some regions, such as the inland Central Petén and the Puuc region in Northern Yucatán, had relatively low access to obsidian despite drawing from the same primary sources of Ixtepeque, San Martin Jilotepeque, and El Chayal in the Guatemalan highlands as other regions of Mesoamerica (Rice 1984; Braswell et al. 2011). This variation has been explained by examining potential inland and riverine trade routes that when combined allow for further transport of bulk obsidian from highlands into lowlands as well as competing commercial and distributional systems created by sociopolitical relationships (Hester et al. 1980; Hammon 1972). More recent network analyses that examine the distribution of obsidian and relationship between actors in the exchange systems aid in understanding this variation as well. These network cluster models highlight the prominence of the Southern Gulf region creating connections between Eastern and Western Mesoamerican obsidian exchange as well as the Pacific coastal region bridging the gap as well (Golitko and Feinman 2015). This could explain the lower quantities and smaller scale of obsidian production in the Maya region during the Preclassic. 
	
The Protoclassic is growing in acceptance as a distinct period in Maya history, but is generally referred to as the Terminal Preclassic (0 – 250 AD). Increases in obsidian production technology, procurement, and distribution can be used as lines of evidence in this debate. In Copan and its hinterland regions the pattern of large flakes spalls and small nodules continued until the late Protoclassic when the population increased and a subsequent rise in production technology (Aoyama 2001). Polyhedral cores and blade production debitage are noted in assemblages related to principle urban group residences suggesting political control by a ruler over obsidian trade and distribution (Aoyama 2001). This time period is also when Teotihuacan was established and rose to prominence in Central Mexico. It has been theorized that Teotihuacan dominated the procurement of nearby obsidian sources and controlled the trade of obsidian into the Maya region due to the increasing presence of Central Mexican obsidian in Maya contexts (Aoyama 2001; Braswell et al. 2011; Hammon 1972). Network clustering and distribution analysis shows Teotihuacan as not being thoroughly connected to the overall obsidian exchange systems during the Protoclassic which means control over obsidian cannot explain the city's rise to prominence (Golitko and Feinman 2015; Spence 1996). During this time there was also a considerable decrease across the Maya region in the use of Ixtepeque and San Martin Jiotepeque obsidian and increases in El Chayal obsidian; a pattern that continued into the Classic (Hester et al. 1980; Moholy-Nagy et al. 1984; Healy et al. 1984).

Classic Period Obsidian
The Classic period Maya region featured large scale prismatic blade production, the exchange of polyhedral cores, and large scale sociopolitical and economic organization (Moholy-Nagy et al. 1984; Knight and Glascock 2009). A very common form of obsidian used to transport it and derive blades from was the polyhedral core, which was most frequently used from the Early to Late Classic (Trachman 1999). Prismatic blades made from polyhedral cores have been found at Copan and its hinterland regions; a dramatic increase in these blades during the Classic has been attributed to a royal dynasty assuming control over procurement of obsidian and production at two workshops in Copan's epicenter (Aoyama 2001). Most of this obsidian came from the Ixtepeque source to make utilitarian blades that all residents had access to, but green obsidian from central Mexico has been found in elite contexts, suggesting long distance exchange ties to Teotihuacan (Aoyama 2001). It is now believed that Classic Maya cities were highly integrated and urbanized, featuring marketplaces and market economies to exchange many goods including obsidian. A market exchange mechanism has been noted at Classic period Calakmul murals that depict a range of specialists near an area that appears to be a market (Feinman and Garraty 2010). Linguistic evidence shows that there are words in the Yucatec Maya language for “market” and “where one buys and sells” (Coronel et al. 2015). Network and cluster analyses show Teotihuacan as being more integrated into the overall obsidian exchange network, but not as highly involved as traditionally believed in the literature that posits the city as the dominate connection between East-West Pachuca, Otumba, and Ucareo obsidian exchange networks (Golitko and Feinman 2015). The Maya region is highly integrated into the overall network but it appears that several routes connected the East and West due to the variety of large, urbanized Maya centers as well as marketplace distribution economies (Golitko and Feinman 2015). Teotihuacan is not the superordinate obsidian source for Classic Maya centers, but rather just one large node in the overall system (Golitko and Feinman 2015). El Chayal appears as the dominant source in many regions during the Early Classic, such as Chunchucmil, Wild Cane Cay, Tikal, the Puuc region, the Peten, and Usamacinta River Basin (Braswell et al. 2011; Hammon 1972; Hutson et al. 2010; Moholy-Nagy 1984; McKillop 1989).

Tikal played a crucial role in obsidian procurement, production, and distribution during the Classic. Tikal dominated the Great Western Trade Route that transported the widely used El Chayal obsidian during the Early Classic (250-550 AD), sharing dominion with Calakmul and Dos Pilas during the Late Classic (Woodfill and Andrieu 2012). At Tikal, the El Chayal obsidian core to blade ratio discovered was 1:22; this overrepresentation of cores suggests blades being produced and distributed from Tikal through a unique economic system and control over a major trade route (Woodfill and Andrieu 2012). During the Late Classic the Northern Lowlands and Yucutan Peninsula feature prominent East-West obsidian connections, likely due to the decline of Teotihuacan and the Southern Maya Lowland region (Golitko and Feinman 2010). At Late Classic Coba, marketplaces were determined to have existed in two large plazas that featured multiple causeway entrances, linear/parallel market stall architecture, and geochemical signatures of high Phosphorus levels in arranged patterns which indicate the presence of traded organic goods (Coronel et al. 2015). In the Puuc region, more central Mexican obsidian entered and while it does appear to be limited to elites only it does appear to be a highly commercialized and valued exchange good linked to Chichen Itza and market distribution (Braswell et al. 2011). The Ixtepeque source dominated at Copan in the Late/Terminal Classic but it is found more frequently in blade and spear tip forms suggesting instability concurrent with regional collapse at the time (Aoyama 2001). The gradual decline of Chichen Itza beginning in the Terminal Classic and lasting into the Early Postclassic is noted in obsidian cluster and network analyses through a much weaker connection between East and West Mesoamerica; Guatemalan and Honduras sources used in that region and Central Mexican sources used in that region which much less exchange occurring (Golitko and Feinman 2014).

Post-Classic Period Obsidian
Obsidian trade was largely relegated to the coast with the collapse of Classic Maya society in the Northern and Southern Lowland regions that occupied the inland areas the Yucutan and River basins. The period from 900-1500 AD saw 80% of

and Cozumel were used as trading bases by invaders in the Early Postclassic but after a mainland collapse the centralized commercial systems in place collapsed as well (Rathje and Sabloff 1973). For Postclassic Copan, an obsidian pattern similar to the Preclassic returned; nonspecialized production utilizing Ixtepeque obsidian used smaller flakes as opposed to polyhedral cores, resulting in fewer prismatic blades and an overall decline in the quantity and quality of utilitarian obsidian found at the site (Aoyama 2001). Obsidian network and cluster analysis shows weak integration in the Early Postclassic but overall greater integration focused on coastal trade nodes for the Late Postclassic Maya region with reformed connections between East and West, but the inland routes do not regain their former prominence (Golitko and Feinman 2015). Very little Central Mexican obsidian is found among Postclassic sites; much of it is believed to be recycled from earlier periods. The site of Colha in Belize utilized Ixtepeque in the Postclassic (Hester et al. 1980). The island site of Wild Cane Cay near Belize was an important port of trade for obsidian among the Postclassic Maya. Obsidian found at Wild Cane Cay is primarily from Highland Guatemala sources but there is some from Central Mexico, with an 80% increase in overall densities mainly in the form of cores during the Postclassic (Mckillop 1989). An estimated 21,686 cores overwhelmingly linked to production areas is recorded for the Postclassic at this site which far exceeds household needs (Mckillop 1989). This positions Wild Cane Cay as an important port of trade in the Postclassic exchange system of obsidian. Ambergis Key on the coast of Belize shows procurement of already reduced polyhedral cores primarily from Ixtepeque obsidian, but other Guatemalan sources are noted (Stemp et al. 2011). The arrival of the Spanish pushed the coastal Maya back inland, disrupting obsidian trade systems developed during the Postclassic which caused the use of recycled cores to rise (Stemp et al. 2011).

See also
Geography of Mesoamerica
Maritime trade in the Maya civilization
Obsidian use in Mesoamerica
Regional communications in ancient Mesoamerica

References

Bibliography 
 Coe, Michael D., "The Maya", Eighth Edition, Thames & Hudson, 2011

Further reading 
 McKillop, Heather. "The Ancient Maya: New Perspectives". New York: Norton, 2004
 Minster, Christopher, "Ancient Maya Economy and Trade"
 Demarest, Arthur “Ancient Maya: the rise and fall of a rainforest civilization” Cambridge University Press, Cambridge UK. 2004
 Ericson, Jonathan E. & Baugh, Timothy G. “The American Southwest and Mesoamerica: systems of prehistoric exchange” Plenum Press, New York. 1993
 Fuente, Beatriz de la “The Pre-Columbian Painting Murals of the Messoamericas” Jaca Books, Italy. 1999
 Herring, Adam “Art and Writing in the Maya cities: AD 600-800” Cambridge University Press, Cambridge UK. 2000
 Aoyama, K. (2001). Classic Maya state, urbanism, and exchange: Chipped stone evidence of the Copán Valley and its hinterland. American Anthropologist, 103(2), 346-360.
 Asaro, F., Michel, H. V., Sidrys, R., & Stross, F. (1978). High-precision chemical characterization of major obsidian sources in Guatemala. American Antiquity, 436-443.
 Braswell, G. E., Paap, I., & Glascock, M. D. (2011). The Obsidian and Ceramics of the Puuc Region: Chronology, Lithic Procurement, and Production at Xkipche, Yucatán, Mexico. Ancient Mesoamerica, 22(01), 135-154.
 Braswell, G. E. (2010). The rise and fall of market exchange: a dynamic approach to ancient Maya economy. Archaeological approaches to market exchange in ancient societies, 127-40.
 Coronel, E. G. (2011). Geochemical analysis of ancient activities at two plazas in Coba, Mexico.
 Coronel, E. G., Hutson, S., Magnoni, A., Balzotti, C., Ulmer, A., & Terry, R. E. (2015). Geochemical analysis of Late Classic and Post Classic Maya marketplace activities at the Plazas of Cobá, Mexico. Journal of Field Archaeology, 40(1), 89-109.
 Dahlin, B. H. (2009). Ahead of its time? The remarkable Early Classic Maya economy of Chunchucmil. Journal of Social Archaeology, 9(3), 341-367.
 Feinman, G. M., & Garraty, C. P. (2010). Preindustrial markets and marketing: Archaeological perspectives. Annual Review of Anthropology, 39, 167-191.
 Golitko, M., & Feinman, G. M. (2015). Procurement and distribution of Pre-Hispanic Mesoamerican Obsidian 900 BC–AD 1520: a social network analysis. Journal of Archaeological Method and Theory, 22(1), 206-247.
 Hammond, N. (1972). Obsidian trade routes in the Mayan area. Science, 178(4065), 1092-1093.
 Healy, P. F., McKillop, H. I., & Walsh, B. (1984). Analysis of obsidian from Moho Cay, Belize: New evidence on Classic Maya trade routes. Science, 225(4660), 414-417.
 Hester, T. R., Shafer, H. J., & Sidrys, R. (1980). On obsidian supply at Colha, Belize. Current Anthropology Chicago, Ill., 21(6), 810-811.
 Hirth, K., Cyphers, A., Cobean, R., De León, J., & Glascock, M. D. (2013). Early Olmec obsidian trade and economic organization at San Lorenzo. Journal of Archaeological Science, 40(6), 2784-2798.
 Hirth, K. G. (1996). Political economy and archaeology: Perspectives on exchange and production. Journal of Archaeological Research, 4(3), 203-239.
 Hutson, S. R., Dahlin, B. H., & Mazeau, D. (2010). Commerce and Cooperation among the Classic Maya. Cooperation in economy and society, 81.
 Knight, C. L., & Glascock, M. D. (2009). The terminal formative to Classic period obsidian assemblage at Palo Errado, Veracruz, Mexico. Latin American Antiquity, 507-524.
 McKillop, H. (1989). Coastal Maya trade: Obsidian densities at Wild Cane Cay. Research in Economic Anthropology, 11, 17-56.
 Moholy-Nagy, H., Asaro, F., & Stross, F. H. (1984). Tikal obsidian: sources and typology. American Antiquity, 104-117.
 Rice, P. M. (1984). Obsidian procurement in the Central Peten lakes region, Guatemala. Journal of Field Archaeology, 11(2), 181-194.
 Rathje, W. L., & Sabloff, J. A. (1973). Ancient Maya commercial systems: A research design for the island of Cozumel, Mexico. World Archaeology, 5(2), 221-231. 
 Shaw, L. C. (2012). The elusive Maya marketplace: An archaeological consideration of the evidence. Journal of Archaeological Research, 20(2), 117-155. Archaeological 79 10 9
 Spence, M. W. (1996). Commodity or gift: Teotihuacan obsidian in the Maya region. Latin American Antiquity, 21-39.
 Stemp, W. J., Graham, E., & Goulet, J. (2011). Coastal Maya Obsidian Trade in the Late Postclassic to Early Colonial Period: The View From San Pedro, Ambergris Caye, Belize. The Journal of Island and Coastal Archaeology, 6(1), 134-154.
 Trachman, R. M. (1999). AN ADDITIONAL TECHNOLOGICAL PERSPECTIVE ON OBSIDIAN POLYHEDRAL CORE PLATFORM REJUVENATION. Lithic Technology, 119-125.

External links
 Maya Trade Routes

Maya civilization